Straight Ahead may refer to:
Straight-ahead jazz, a jazz music style
Straight ahead animation, a method of animation
Straight Ahead (Abbey Lincoln album), 1961
Straight Ahead (band), an American hardcore punk band
Straight Ahead (David "Fathead" Newman album), 1961
Straight Ahead (Oliver Nelson album), 1961
Straight Ahead!, a 1964 The Goldebriars album
Straight Ahead! (Junior Mance album), 1964
Basie Straight Ahead, 1968
Straight Ahead (Eddie "Lockjaw" Davis album), 1976
Straight Ahead! (Freddie Redd album), 1977
Straight Ahead (Art Blakey album), 1981
Straight Ahead (Amy Grant album), 1984
Straight Ahead (Greg Sage album), 1985
Straight Ahead (Stanley Turrentine album), 1986
Straight Ahead (Ignite album), 1996
Straight Ahead (Pennywise album), also its title track "Straight Ahead", 1999
"Straight Ahead", a Kool & the Gang song on their album In the Heart
"Straight Ahead", a Jimi Hendrix song on the posthumous 1997 album First Rays of the New Rising Sun
"Straight Ahead" (Tube & Berger song), a 2004 song by Tube & Berger featuring Chrissie Hynde